Gubesh Peak is the peak rising to 1407 m in Flowers Hills, Sentinel Range in Ellsworth Mountains, Antarctica.  It surmounts Rutford Ice Stream to the east and Sikera Valley to the west.

The peak is named after the settlement of Gubesh in Western Bulgaria.

Location
US mapping in 1961, updated in 1988.

See also
 Mountains in Antarctica

Maps
 Vinson Massif.  Scale 1:250 000 topographic map.  Reston, Virginia: US Geological Survey, 1988.
 Antarctic Digital Database (ADD). Scale 1:250000 topographic map of Antarctica. Scientific Committee on Antarctic Research (SCAR). Since 1993, regularly updated.

Notes

External links
 Gubesh Peak. SCAR Composite Antarctic Gazetteer.
 Bulgarian Antarctic Gazetteer. Antarctic Place-names Commission. (details in Bulgarian, basic data in English)

External links
 Gubesh Peak. Copernix satellite image

Bulgaria and the Antarctic
Ellsworth Mountains
Mountains of Ellsworth Land